Michael Leonard Hecht (born August 31, 1970) is an American economic developer and businessman based in New Orleans, who is currently President & CEO of Greater New Orleans, Inc, the post-Hurricane Katrina economic development organization for the New Orleans region. Hecht has previously led the post-Katrina Business Recovery Program for the State of Louisiana, and the post-9/11 Small Business Assistance Program for New York City.

Early life and education
Hecht grew up in White Plains, New York.  He went to Yale University, where he created a self-designed major in Race Relations, consisting of study in Sociology, Economics and African-American Studies, and later attended Stanford Business School, where he received his MBA in 1998.

Career
After graduating Yale, Hecht went to work for Marakon Associates, a financial and strategic management consultancy. At Marakon, Hecht worked for Fortune 100 companies in the US, Canada, Australia and Europe, including Coca-Cola, IBM and Kellogg.  While in business school, Hecht and a partner started Variety Lights Development, a hospitality development and management company in San Francisco.  Of three properties opened, their most successful was Foreign Cinema, which opened in August 1999.

In 2003, Hecht joined the administration of Mayor Michael Bloomberg, to develop and manage a post 9/11 recovery program for small businesses.  As an Assistant Commissioner at the NYC Department of Small Business Services, Hecht opened Business Solution Centers around New York City, as well as developed NYC Business Express, an online portal for opening and running a business. In fall of 2006 Hecht was named Director of Business Recovery for the State of Louisiana, within the Department of Louisiana Economic Development, with the mandate to assist businesses impacted by Hurricane Katrina. Over the next two years, Hecht developed and managed the $220M Louisiana Business Recovery Grant and Loan" program], and the $9.5M Technical Assistance to Small Firms" program.

In summer of 2008, Hecht was named President & CEO with Greater New Orleans, Inc. (GNO, Inc.), the economic development organization charged with rebuilding the economy of Greater New Orleans following Hurricane Katrina. In 2015, he spoke at TEDxNewOrleans. The work of GNO, Inc. has included recruiting companies like DXC Technology, bringing British Airways to New Orleans Airport, passing federal legislation on National Flood Insurance - the Homeowners Flood Insurance Affordability Act of 2014, and passing tax reform for Louisiana that lowered income taxes.  In September of 2022, GNO, Inc., was awarded $50M from the U.S. Economic Development Administration for "H2theFuture," a plan to develop clean hydrogen for Louisiana industry.

In 2022, Hecht was named Honorary Consul of Finland for Louisiana, Arkansas and Mississippi.

Recognition
Hecht has been broadly recognized for his economic development work, including:  #2 Economic Development Deal in America 2017 (Silver Award); Congressional testimony on the National Flood Insurance Program (NFIP); Norman C. Francis Leadership Institute Fellow; "1 of 10 People Who Made a Difference" in the South; "1 of the 25 Most Powerful People" in the 10/12 Corridor; CEO of the Year for 2018 in Biz New Orleans magazine.  In September of 2022, GNO, Inc. was named "Economic Development Organization of the Year" by the International Economic Development Council.

References

Living people
21st-century American businesspeople
Yale University alumni
Stanford Graduate School of Business alumni
1970 births